Jamnice is a village in the municipality of Stěbořice in the Opava District, Czech Republic. In 2009, there were 70 registered addresses. In 2001, there were 251 permanent inhabitants.

References

Populated places in Opava District
Neighbourhoods in the Czech Republic